Yvonne Suzanne Chazelles de Chaxel, better known as Dany Carrel, (born 20 September 1932 or 20 September 1935) is a French actress.  She was born in Vietnam - then French Indochina - to French father Aimé Chazelles de Chaxel and his Vietnamese mistress, Kim. She gradually retired starting from the eighties due to two bouts of cancer. In 2021, she was hospitalized for three weeks after contracting COVID-19.

Selected filmography
 Dortoir des grandes (1953)
  “Maternite Clandestine” (1953) 
 Women's Club (1956)
 People of No Importance (1956)
 Porte des Lilas (1957)
 Girls for the Summer (1958)
 This Desired Body (1959)
 The Goose of Sedan (1959)
 Mill of the Stone Women (1960)
 The Hands of Orlac (1960)
 Une souris chez les hommes (1964)
 Trap for Cinderella (1965)
 An Idiot in Paris (1967)
 A Little Virtuous (1968)
 La prisonnière (1968)
 Clérambard (1969)
 Trois milliards sans ascenseur (1972)
 Schools Falling Apart (1981)

References

External links
 
 Dany Carrel in Cult Sirens

1932 births
French film actresses
French television actresses
Living people
20th-century French actresses